Two ships of the French Navy have borne the name Lapérouse in honour of Jean-François de Galaup, comte de Lapérouse

 , an unarmoured barbette cruiser, lead ship of her class
 , a hydrographic survey ship, lead ship of her class

French Navy ship names